Flarestar Observatory (obs. code: 171) is an astronomical observatory owned and operated and managed by astronomer and AAVSO-member Stephen M. Brincat. It is located near San Ġwann on the island country of Malta. 

The observatory's principal instrument is a Meade 0.25-meter aperture Schmidt-Cassegrain Telescope (SCT), which is routinely employed for photometric observations of asteroids and monitoring variable stars.

References 

Astronomical observatories in Malta
San Ġwann